Heinrich Charrasky or Heinrich Charasky (born 1656 in Hungary; died 1710) was a Hungarian sculptor in the 18th century. In the year 1710 Charasky was called to Heidelberg for the creation of the electorate's coat of arms at the town hall. He also created the gilded statue of Diana in the garden of the Schwetzingen Palace.

External links

Hungarian sculptors
1656 births
1710 deaths